The 1976 Australian Grand Prix was a motor race held at the Sandown International Motor Racing Circuit in Victoria, Australia on 12 September 1976. It was open to racing cars complying with either Australian Formula 1 or Australian Formula 2.

The race was the forty first Australian Grand Prix and doubled as Round 1 of the 1976 Australian Drivers' Championship. John Goss won the race driving a Matich A53 Repco-Holden, and in doing so became the only driver to win both of Australia's highest profile motor races, the Australian Grand Prix and the Bathurst 1000. Goss won the 47 lap race by just half a second from Australian international Vern Schuppan who was driving an Elfin MR8 Chevrolet entered by Ansett Team Elfin. Finishing third, over a lap behind, was John Leffler driving a Lola T400 Chevrolet.

Qualifying results

Race results

References

External links
 1976 Australian Grand Prix Sandown, www.youtube.com

Grand Prix
Australian Grand Prix
Motorsport at Sandown
Formula 5000 race reports
Australian Grand Prix